Archips naltarica is a species of moth of the family Tortricidae. It is found in India (Jammu and Kashmir).

The ground colour of the forewings is glossy cream, with an indistinct pinkish hue. The hindwings are cream orange, but paler basally. Males are darker than females and have more brown markings.

References

External links

Archips
Moths described in 2006
Moths of Asia
Taxa named by Józef Razowski